Jacob Ross Guymer (born ) is an Australian male volleyball player. He plays for the Australia men's national volleyball team. At club level he plays for Orkelljunga VK.

References

External links
 Player's Biography, FIVB

1993 births
Living people
Australian men's volleyball players
Place of birth missing (living people)